The Women's List or Women's Alliance, also called Kvennalistinn and abbreviated KL, was a feminist political party in Iceland that took part in national politics from 1983 to 1999. The party held three seats in the parliament elected in 1983, six seats in 1987, five seats in 1991 and three seats in 1995.

In 1999 it formed an alliance with three other left wing and centre-left parties called the Social Democratic Alliance,  which then merged into a party by that name in 2000. However, about half the members of the Women's List disapproved of this and chose to join the Left-Green Movement instead. Ingibjörg Sólrún Gísladóttir, former leader of the Alliance and former Minister of Foreign Affairs started her political career in the Women's List, and was Mayor of Reykjavík as a member of that party.

Members of Alþingi
Anna Ólafsdóttir Björnsson (1989–1995)
Danfríður Skarphéðinsdóttir (1987–1991)
Guðrún Agnarsdóttir (1983–1990)
Jóna Valgerður Kristjánsdóttir (1991–1995)
Kristín Ástgeirsdóttir (1991–1999)
Kristín Einarsdóttir (1987–1995)
Kristín Halldórsdóttir (1983–1989, 1995–1999)
Málmfríður Sigurðardóttir (1987–1991)
Þórhildur Þorleifsdóttir (1987–1991)
Þórunn Sveinbjarnardóttir (temporary in 1996)

References

Defunct political parties in Iceland
Feminist political parties in Iceland
1983 establishments in Iceland
Political parties established in 1983
2000 disestablishments in Iceland
Political parties disestablished in 2000
Social Democratic Alliance